The Cassine River worm lizard (Cynisca oligopholis) is a worm lizard species in the family Amphisbaenidae. It is found in Guinea-Bissau and Guinea.

References

Cynisca (lizard)
Reptiles described in 1906
Taxa named by George Albert Boulenger